PK-85 Nowshera-III is a constituency for the Khyber Pakhtunkhwa Assembly of the Khyber Pakhtunkhwa province of Pakistan.

See also
 PK-84 Nowshera-II
 PK-86 Nowshera-IV

References

External links 
 Election Commission of Pakistan's official website

Khyber Pakhtunkhwa Assembly constituencies